Guro (Gouro), also known as  Kweni (Kwéndré) and Lo, is a Southern Mande language spoken by approximately a million people in Ivory Coast, primarily in the areas of Haut-Sassandra and Marahoue, and the Goh.

Writing system

References

Languages of Ivory Coast
Mande languages